Pierre Joseph Raynald Jarry (born March 30, 1949) is a Canadian retired professional ice hockey player who played 344 games in the National Hockey League and 18 games in the World Hockey Association between 1971 and 1978. He played for the Toronto Maple Leafs, New York Rangers, Minnesota North Stars, Detroit Red Wings, and Edmonton Oilers.

Career statistics

Regular season and playoffs

External links
 

1949 births
Living people
Canadian ice hockey right wingers
Detroit Red Wings players
Edmonton Oilers (WHA) players
Fort Worth Texans players
Ice hockey people from Montreal
Minnesota North Stars players
National Hockey League first-round draft picks
New Haven Nighthawks players
New York Rangers draft picks
New York Rangers players
Omaha Knights (CHL) players
Ottawa 67's players
Toronto Maple Leafs players
Virginia Wings players